Szidónia Lázárné Vajda (née Vajda; born 20 January 1979) is a Romanian-Hungarian chess player with the FIDE titles of International Master (IM) and Woman Grandmaster (WGM). She won the women's Hungarian Chess Championship in 2004 and 2015.

In 1995 she won the Under-16 girls' section of the European Youth Chess Championship.

She played in the bronze medal-winning Romanian team in the 3rd Women's European Team Chess Championship in Batumi 1999 and played for Hungary in the Women's Chess Olympiads of 2002, 2004, 2006 and 2008.

In 2009, she won the 1st Teller Ede Memorial in Paks.

She is the sister of GM Levente Vajda.

References

External links

Szidonia Vajda chess games at 365Chess.com

1979 births
Living people
Chess International Masters
Chess woman grandmasters
Romanian female chess players
Hungarian female chess players
People from Odorheiu Secuiesc